Travis Michael Wall (born September 16, 1987) is an American dancer, instructor, and choreographer specializing in contemporary and jazz dance styles. He rose to international attention in 2006 as a competitor on the second season of the Fox television show So You Think You Can Dance. As of 2009, he was a choreographer for the show earning Emmy nominations every year from 2011 to 2019; and winning twice. In 2012, he starred in the Oxygen reality show All The Right Moves, where he, Teddy Forance, Nick Lazzarini and Kyle Robinson launched their own dance company called Shaping Sound.

Early life and background

Wall was born and raised in Virginia Beach, Virginia. His mother, owner and operator of the eponymous Denise Wall's Dance Energy, recalls putting him in a walker and watching him imitate the dancers. He began dancing at the age of three, training at his mother's studio, and competing in a number of conventions.

Career

Early career and training
His professional career officially started at the age of nine when he appeared in a Dr. Pepper commercial.<ref>Travis Wall: Portrait of the young man as an artist movmnt, June 20, 2006.</ref> In 1999, he won the Junior National Outstanding Dancer Scholarship Award. On April 27, 2001, at age 12, he started a two-year run in The Music Man on Broadway, playing a resident of River City/Winthrop Paroo understudy. This led to him performing at the 2000 wall mirror's closing-night gala. In 2006, New York City Dance Alliance awarded Wall its Teen Outstanding Dancer of the Year award and he toured with the group for a year.

So You Think You Can Dance
In 2006, at the age of 18, Wall competed on the second season of the show So You Think You Can Dance (SYTYCD), making it to the final four contestants before placing second behind overall winner Benji Schwimmer. Wall was praised by the judges as the most technically talented dancer in the competition.{{wall mirror}} Nigel Lythgoe and Adam Shankman have listed Wall, his brother Danny Tidwell, Season 4's Will Wingfield and Season 5's Kayla Radomski as the most talented dancers on the show, later adding Season 6's Billy Bell and Jakob Karr to that list.

While on the show, Wall danced in Mia Michaels' The Bench routine for which she later won an Emmy for Outstanding Choreography. During the Fall of 2006, Wall toured the United States with the top 10 dancers from the So You Think You Can Dance competition. He returned to the show in 2008 during the Season 4 auditions to teach choreography. He did a surprise audition on the 4th episode as "Danielle Chorizo".

On July 23, 2009, Wall returned to So You Think You Can Dance along with fellow Season 2 contestant Heidi Groskreutz on the 100th episode of the show, to perform the Emmy award-winning piece The Bench, choreographed by Mia Michaels.

Post-SYTYCD
Wall danced on the October 16, 2007 Dancing with the Stars results show, in a piece choreographed by and starring Wade Robson. Wall, along with Tidwell and many previous finalists of So You Think You Can Dance, performed during the second annual Idol Gives Back charity event on April 9, 2008. Nigel Lythgoe produced both shows at the time.

Wall performs regularly with American Dance Artists, in Delmarva, as well as for Evolution dance company in Los Angeles, California. He teaches students contemporary dance at NUVO, a dance convention that tours the nation. In 2007, Wall and Ivan Koumaev made a dance video called Its About Time designed to be for the viewer's entertainment rather than for instructional purposes like most dance videos.

Wall was in the 2008 Disney movie Bedtime Stories, starring Adam Sandler, alongside SYTYCD Season 3 contestant, Lacey Schwimmer. In 2010 Wall worked as an assistant choreographer for the Academy Awards, alongside Mia Michaels and Brian Friedman.So You Think You Can Dance Get Fit: Cardio Funk was one of two home exercise videos released by the producers of SYTYCD. Wall choreographed a contemporary dance and corresponding cool-down routine for the video.

Wall choreographed and performed in an ensemble piece featuring New York City Ballet principal ballerina Tiler Peck to a piece by Nuttin' But Stringz for ABC's Dancing with the Stars April 13, 2010 episode in a feature called "Macy's Stars of Dance".BLOOM, JULIE (April 7, 2010), "'Dancing' To Feature City Ballet Principal". New York Times. :3

In 2010, Wall choreographed several numbers for the VMA's.

In 2011, Wall choreographed a floor exercise routine for Olympic All-Around Champion Nastia Liukin which she will use to try to earn a spot on the 2012 Olympic USA Gymnastics team.

Wall will be starring in a new reality show "All the Right Moves" with Teddy Forance, Nick Lazzarini, and Kyle Robinson. The four men are launching their own dance company called Shaping Sound.

Wall has appeared twice on RuPaul’s Drag Race, first in the season 5 episode “Why It Gotta Be Black, Swan?” to choreograph a ballet based on the life of RuPaul, and most recently in the season 11 episode “Draglympics” to choreograph routines for an Olympics-like challenge.

Wall has appeared in two episodes of Dallas Cowboys Cheerleaders: Making the Team in seasons 13 and 14 to choreograph routines for the Dallas Cowboys Cheerleaders training camp candidates.

In 2018, Wall has appeared in a video against homophobia, dancing on This is me from The Greatest Showman while Shoshana Bean is singing.

In 2019, Wall choreographed the Off-Broadway musical “The Wrong Man” which debuted at the MCC theater, featuring Joshua Henry.

Wall was removed from the dance company Break the Floor (BTF) in 2021 after allegations that he had engaged in sexually inappropriate behavior. BTF said in a statement on Instagram that “Travis will not be traveling with BTF until we’ve had the opportunity for a third-party to look into these allegations.”  Wall has denied the accusations. 

Choreography for So You Think You Can Dance
Wall earned 2011 and 2013 Emmy nominations for his contemporary choreography in seasons 7 and 9. He won a 2015 Emmy for routines he choreographed for season 11. (See SYTYCD Emmy Awards for details.) Along with Mandy Moore, he jointly won a 2017 Creative Emmy Award.

Danced as Guest or All-Star for So You Think You Can Dance

Publications
In February 2007, Wall was featured in a fashion/dance spread in movmnt magazine (which Tidwell co-founded). The following June, Wall interviewed Whoopi Goldberg for the magazine.

Wall was featured in the photography book Moving Still: a Life Performance by David Benaym.

Personal life
In 2007, his adoptive brother Danny Tidwell was a runner-up of the third season of So You Think You Can Dance''. He, too, had trained with their mother Denise Wall, who also trained Jaimie Goodwin, a Season 3 contestant. Wall is openly gay. In March 2016, he got engaged to UCLA gymnastics coach Dom Palange after 5 years of dating. Wall announced the couple's split on his Instagram page on August 3, 2018.

Filmography

Awards

Primetime Emmy Awards
Source:

References

External links
 
 
 
 "Moving Still" book featuring Wall
 Shaping Sound official website

1987 births
Living people
American choreographers
American contemporary dancers
American male dancers
Dance teachers
Gay entertainers
LGBT dancers
American LGBT entertainers
LGBT people from Virginia
People from Virginia Beach, Virginia
Primetime Emmy Award winners
So You Think You Can Dance (American TV series) contestants
So You Think You Can Dance choreographers